Gustavo Agustín Viera Velázquez (born 28 August 1995) is a Paraguayan professional footballer who plays as a midfielder for Independiente F.B.C.

Career
Viera played in his youth career for Libertad, before moving to Rubio Ñu. He made his professional debut for the club in 2012 and remained there until 2014. In August 2014, he transferred to Corinthians in Brazil. Despite already being a professional player, Viera was relocated to Corinthians' youth team. The central midfielder scored the winning goal at the U20 Campeonato Brasileiro final against Atlético Paranaense and was chosen as the best player of the tournament.

International career
He was called by Paraguay national under-20 football team to play in the 2015 South American Youth Football Championship.

Honours
Corinthians
Campeonato Brasileiro Série A: 2015

References

External links

corinthians.com.br  at corinthians.com.br

1995 births
Living people
Paraguayan footballers
Paraguay under-20 international footballers
Paraguayan expatriate footballers
Paraguayan Primera División players
Club Rubio Ñu footballers
Sport Club Corinthians Paulista players
2015 South American Youth Football Championship players
Expatriate footballers in Brazil
Association football midfielders